K32OJ-D, virtual and UHF digital channel 32, branded on-air as TSTV (Texas Student Television), is a low-powered independent television station licensed to Austin, Texas, United States. The station is owned by the University of Texas. Founded in 1995 as K09VR on channel 9, it is one of only a handful of FCC-licensed television stations in the country run entirely by students.

On cable, the station can be found on channel 15 via the campus cable system serving the university. TSTV also streams live to its website.

The station features such long time shows such as Texas News Primetime (previously Texas News Channel), Austin Undeground, Sneak Peek, Longhorn Latenight, College Crossfire, Good Morning Texas, College Press Box, Local Live, and Video Game Hour Live. One show, Campus Loop, was nationally syndicated on the College Broadcast network. It was produced from 1999 until 2001 and still airs repeats today.

Notable Hollywood personalities have appeared on several of the station's shows or segments, including Pauly Shore, Mark Cuban, Dennis Quaid and Robert Rodriguez.

Writer, producer and director Wes Anderson was briefly affiliated with the station as a student at the university. Here he met future collaborator Owen Wilson. Zach Anner, Internet star and host of the OWN show "Rollin' with Zach Anner" worked at the station, starring and producing such shows like "That's Awesome!" and "The Wingmen". Creator of Red vs. Blue and Rooster Teeth Productions, Burnie Burns worked at the station in the early nineties and created their longest running show, "Sneak Peek".

Todd Berger, writer and director of the films The Scenesters and It's a Disaster, worked at the station in the late 1990s, and wrote and directed Campus Loop.

Digital television
In January 2010, TSTV began broadcasting digitally on UHF channel 29 under a new call sign, K29HW-D. Fund-raising efforts were held to raise the $85,000 needed to convert the station to digital. As a low-power station, K09VR was not required to meet the June 12, 2009 deadline to convert from analog to digital. This rule applied only to full-power U.S. TV stations. Its license for analog channel 9 (K09VR) has since been cancelled. In June 2011, TSTV increased transmitter power to 3,400 watts, enhancing its coverage across most of Austin, and to an estimated 75,000 households who watch television via antenna.

TSTV also has two subchannels, with 29.2 simulcasting KVRX's radio signal and 29.3 airing infomercials.

TSTV moved from UHF channel 29 to UHF channel 32 in July 2022, with a power increase to 7.5 kilowatts, and changed its call sign to K32OJ-D.

Programming 
TSTV's programming schedule consists of shows produced by students, ranging from scripted comedy shows, news (entertainment and sports), and musical variety shows.  TSTV's Sports shows include: College Pressbox, which informs viewers on all news related to Texas Athletics; College Crossfire, which provides sports debate on all the hot issues around sports; The 1-0 Sports Show, a morning podcast show which provides insights on sports around the nation; Texas Countdown, a pregame show more major UT athletic events; and TSTV Gameday, which provides play-by-play for UT club sports.  In addition to their shows, the sports department provides live tweeting coverage of many UT sporting events.

References

External links

Official Youtube

Student television stations in the United States
Television stations in Austin, Texas
Texas Student Media
Television channels and stations established in 1995
Low-power television stations in the United States
TSTV alumni
1995 establishments in Texas